These are the UK Official Indie Chart number-one albums of the 1980s, as compiled by MRIB.

See also
List of UK Independent Singles Chart number ones of the 1980s
1980s in music
List of UK Albums Chart number ones of the 1980s

References

Independent 1980s